Randolph Field Independent School District is a public school district based in Universal City, Texas (USA).

Mission statement
The purpose of education at Randolph Field ISD is to prepare individuals to be continual learners who are successful, productive, responsible citizens.  To achieve this purpose, students will access and process information, solve problems, and communicate, working as individuals and as team members, using technology to facilitate their learning.

District Information
The district serves the children of local military and DoD personnel.  So long as a parent or guardian is assigned to Joint-Base San Antonio, the student does not have to physically reside on the base to attend Randolph schools; however, the student must be accepted on a transfer basis in such cases.  Pre-kindergarten children are not accepted into the transfer program and must reside on Randolph Air Force Base.

Randolph Field ISD is not part of the Department of Defense Education Activity; it is an independent school district subject to the jurisdiction of the Texas Education Agency. Randolph Field ISD is one of three school districts in the state whose boundaries are coterminous with a military installation; the other two (also in the San Antonio area) are Lackland ISD and Fort Sam Houston ISD.  Founded in 1932, it was the first school district in Texas to serve a military installation. As the district's boundaries are coterminous with those of Randolph Air Force Base, the facilities of which by law are exempt from property taxation, the district has no taxable base; thus, funding is provided from United States Department of Education Impact Aid funds and state public school foundation funding.

In 2014, the school district was ranked number 1 in the rankings for the Best School Districts in the Greater San Antonio Area in a field of over 35 school districts. 
The district is currently ranked 27th out of 1,265 districts in the State of Texas.

In 2009, the school district was rated "recognized" by the Texas Education Agency.

Schools
Randolph High School (Grades 9-12)
Randolph Middle School (Grades 6-8)
National Blue Ribbon School in 2001-02
Randolph Elementary School (Grades PK-5)
National Blue Ribbon School in 2000-01

References

External links

School districts in Bexar County, Texas
1932 establishments in Texas
School districts established in 1932
Joint Base San Antonio